Yōshin Go-ryū (容眞御流) is a Japanese school of ikebana.

References

External links 
 Official Facebook page 

Kadō schools